Montague is a male given name. Notable people with the name include:

 Montague Ainslie
 Montague Aldous
 Monty Banks
 Sir Montague Barlow
 Montague Bertie, 11th Earl of Lindsey
 Montague Bertie, 12th Earl of Lindsey
 Montague Birch
 Montague Browning
 Montague Burton
 Montague Burton Professor of International Relations
 Montague Chambers
 Montague Chamberlain
 Sir Montague Cholmeley, 1st Baronet of the Cholmeley baronets
 Sir Montague Cholmeley, 2nd Baronet of the Cholmeley baronets
 M. Graham Clark
 Montague John Druitt
 Montague James Furlong, boxer commonly known as Jim Hall
 Montague Harry Holcroft
 Montague James Mathew
 Sir Montagu Aubrey Rowley Cholmeley, 4th Baronet of the Cholmeley baronets
 Sir Montague John Cholmeley, 6th Baronet of the Cholmeley baronets
 Montague Dawson
 Montague Eliot, 8th Earl of St Germans
 Montague Fordham
 Montague Glover
 Montague Gore
 Montague Guest
 Montague Hambling
 M. R. James
 Montague Jayawickrama (1911-2001), Sri Lankan Sinhala politician
 Montague Lessler
 Montagu Love
 Montague Miller
 Montague Modlyn
 Montague Muir-Mackenzie
 Montague Napier
 Montague Noble
 Montague Ongley
 Monte Pfeffer
 Monty Porter
 Montague Scott
 Montague Shearman
 Montague Edward Smith
 Montague Sturt
 Montague Summers
 Montague Tyrwhitt-Drake
 Montague Ullman
 Montague Waldegrave, 5th Baron Radstock
 Monty Wedd
 Monty Westmore
 Montague White
 Montague Williamson
 Montague Wilmot
 Montague Woodhouse, 5th Baron Terrington
 Montague Younger

See also
 Montagu (disambiguation)

Masculine given names